is a Japanese given name which can be given to either gender.

Possible writings
智美, "wisdom, intellect, reason, beauty"
知美, "knowledge, beauty"
朋美, "companion, friend, beauty"
友美, "friend, beauty"
智実, "wisdom, fruit"
智実, "wisdom, intellect, reason, truth"
知実, "knowledge, truth"
供実, "offer, truth"
共美, "together, beauty"
トモミ, katakana characters for Tomomi
ともみ, hiragana characters for Tomomi

People with the name
, Japanese pole vaulter
, Japanese musician and composer
, Japanese swimmer
, Japanese-Estonian architect
, Japanese swimmer
, Japanese politician
, Japanese singer and idol
, Japanese ice hockey player
, Japanese politician
, Japanese pop singer
, Japanese shogi player
, Japanese singer and idol
, Japanese field hockey player
, Japanese motorcycle racer
, Japanese voice actress
, Japanese actress
, Japanese anime director and producer
, Japanese swimmer
, Japanese novelist
, Japanese conductor
, Japanese volleyball player
Tomomi Ogawa (小川 ともみ, born 1990), Japanese bassist
, Japanese speed skater
Tomomi Jiena Sumi (鷲見 友美ジェナ, born 1994), Japanese singer
, Japanese baseball player
, Japanese pole vaulter
, Japanese model and boxer
, Japanese professional wrestler
, Japanese anthropologist
, Japanese Paralympic athlete

Fictional characters
Tomomi Matsunaga, a character in the manga series Miracle Girls

Japanese unisex given names